Amira Osman Hamed is a Sudanese women’s rights activist and co-founder of  No to Oppression against Women Initiative.

Born in 1976 in Sudan, Amira Osman Hamed studied computer engineering. Under President Omar al-Bashir, she was arrested twice in 2013 for refusing to wear a headscarf that covered her hair, and in 2002 for wearing pants. These cases recall the case of journalist Loubna al-Hussein in 2009. Amira Osman Sudanese and international organizations mobilized to support her and she was released.

In April 2019, Omar el-Bashir was overthrown. A transition began towards a democratic regime. But it was interrupted by a new military coup in October 2021, bringing Abdel Fattah al-Burhan to power. Again, this regime imprisoned its opponents. Amira Osman was arrested by a police raid on her home in January 2022. She was detained in Omdurman. A new mobilization of Sudanese and international organizations organized to obtain her release, which they obtained in early February 2022, after more than two weeks of incommunicado detention. She remained subject to prosecution. She then tried to lead the mobilization against the military, notably demonstrating in front of the Omdurman women's prison.

In 2022, she won the Front Line Defenders Award for Human Rights Defenders at Risk.

References

1976 births
Living people
Sudanese women's rights activists